Loarki (as known in Pakistan), or Gade Lohar (as known in India), is a Rajasthani language spoken by 20,000 nomadic people in rural Sindh, Pakistan, and by 1,000 in Rajasthan, India.

References

Languages of Rajasthan